Absorption cross section is a measure for the probability of an absorption process. More generally, the term cross section is used in physics to quantify the probability of a certain particle-particle interaction, e.g., scattering, electromagnetic absorption, etc. (Note that light in this context is described as consisting of particles, i.e., photons.) In honor of the fundamental contribution of Maria Goeppert Mayer to this area, the unit for the two-photon absorption cross section is named the "GM". One GM is 10−50 cm4⋅s⋅photon−1.

In the context of ozone shielding of ultraviolet light, absorption cross section is the ability of a molecule to absorb a photon of a particular wavelength and polarization. Analogously, in the context of nuclear engineering it refers to the probability of a particle (usually a neutron) being absorbed by a nucleus.  Although the units are given as an area, it does not refer to an actual size area, at least partially because the density or state of the target molecule will affect the probability of absorption. Quantitatively, the number  of photons absorbed, between the points  and  along the path of a beam is the product of the number  of photons penetrating to depth  times the number  of absorbing molecules per unit volume times the absorption cross section :

.

The absorption cross-section is closely related to molar absorptivity  and mass absorption coefficient.

For a given particle and its energy, the absorption cross-section of the target material can be calculated from mass absorption coefficient using:

where: 
  is the mass absorption coefficient
  is the molar mass in g/mol
  is Avogadro constant

This is also commonly expressed as:

where: 
  is the absorption coefficient
  is the atomic number density

See also

 Cross section (physics)
 Photoionisation cross section
 Nuclear cross section
 Neutron cross section
 Mean free path
 Compton scattering
 Transmittance
 Attenuation
 Beer–Lambert law
 High energy X-rays
 Attenuation coefficient
 Absorption spectroscopy

References

Electromagnetism
Nuclear physics
Scattering, absorption and radiative transfer (optics)